Soldina is a village in Narva-Jõesuu, Ida-Viru County in northeastern Estonia.

Narva Airfield (ICAO: EENA) is located in Soldina.

References

Villages in Ida-Viru County